Klassikaraadio ('Radio of Classics') is an Estonian radio program/station which is managed by Estonian Public Broadcasting (formerly Estonian Radio). Klassikaraadio is the only radio station in Estonia which regularly transmit classical music. Klassikaraadio started on 1 April 1995.

TNS Emor's survey in 2018 showed that every week about 94.000 people listen to Klassikaraadio.

Programming
Notable programs:
 "Helikaja" 
 "Delta"
 "Da capo"
 "Fantaasia" 
 "Kontserdisaalis" (broadcasting from live concerts).

References

External links
 

1995 establishments in Estonia
Classical music radio stations
Eesti Rahvusringhääling
Radio stations established in 1995
Radio stations in Estonia